Oleksandr Vysotskyi (born 16 June 1986 in Alushta, Ukraine, Soviet Union) is a professional Ukrainian football goalkeeper.

External links
Profile on Football Squads

1986 births
Living people
Ukrainian footballers
FC Lviv players
Association football goalkeepers
People from Alushta